The Hit Parade is the covers album by Tak Matsumoto in conjunction with several guest artists. It was released on 26 November 2003 through Vermillion Records.

Background
The album features cover songs, which were popular during 70's and 80's in the Japan music scene from following artist as Momoe Yamaguchi, Candies, Akina Nakamori or Tatsuro Yamashita.

The album has been performed by young artist from Giza Studio such as Mai Kuraki or Rina Aiuchi, and veterans artist from 90's such as Keiko Utoku or Koshi Inaba. Originally the 20 songs were recorded, however 17 were included. The recording started in 2002 and end in 2003.

The album jacket cover visually resembles to The London Howlin' Wolf Sessions by Howlin' Wolf.

In 2010, after fraud scandal with Azumi Uehara is 2003 album version out of print. However, on 31 December 2018, after fifteen years the album was re-printed, which included limited Kansai version of Koshi Inaba's Minano no Yoko, Yokohama, Yokosuka.

Promotion

Singles
The first promotional cover single was Ihoujin, originally performed by Saki Kubota and covered by Zard. The single was released on 27 August 2003. The B-side song includes cover of Ame no Machi wo, originally performed by Arai Yumi and covered by Akiko Matsuda from Ramjet Pulley. In the media, cover version of Ihoujin was broadcast as an insert theme song for Fuji TV television drama Anata no Soba ni Dare ka Iru. The single debuted at number three on the Oricon Weekly Single Charts and charted for sixteen weeks. The single has sold over 155,263 copies. The single was announced in 2003 as the 58th biggest selling single of the year.

The second promotional cover single was Imitation Gold, originally performed by Momoe Yamaguchi and covered by Mai Kuraki. The single was released on 8 October 2003. The B-side song includes cover of Watashi wa Kaze, originally performed by Carmen Maki & Oz and covered by Yuri Nakamura from Garnet Crow. The length of B-side song is over seven minutes, which makes the longest track from cover album. The single debuted at number one on the Oricon Weekly Single Charts. The single has sold over 75,000 copies.

Charting performance
The album debuted at number two on the Oricon Weekly Albums Chart and sold 225,125 copies in its first week.

The album was announced in 2004 as the 27th biggest selling album of the year. The album sold more than 450,000 copies.

The album has been rewarded with The Best Pop-Rock album of year by Japan Gold Disc Award in 2004.

Track list

Personnel
Credits adapted from the album booklet.
Tak Matsumoto: guitar, vocal, arrange
Hideo Yamaki: drum
Akihito Tokunaga: bass, arrange
Yoshinobu Ohga: arrange
Koshi Inaba: Blues Harp
Akira Onizuka: acoustic piano, organ

References

Covers albums
2003 albums
Japanese-language albums
Tak Matsumoto albums
Being Inc. albums